The 2019 Spikers’ Turf Open Conference was the fourteenth conference of the Spikers' Turf. The tournament began on August 20, 2019 with a total of 24 teams. San Beda replaced PNP, which was forced to withdraw from the competition after failing to secure permission from their superior officers.

A total of four pools with six squads each pool that will compete in a single-round robin elimination round.

Participating teams

Preliminary round 

 Pool A team standings

|}
 Pool B team standings

|}
 Pool C team standings

|}
 Pool D team standings

|}

Point system:
3 points = win match in 3 or 4 sets
2 points = win match in 5 sets
1 point  = lose match in 5 sets
0 point  = lose match in 3 or 4 sets

Match results
All times are in Philippines Standard Time (UTC+08:00)

|}

Final round

Quarterfinals 
All times are in Philippines Standard Time (UTC+08:00)

|}

Semifinals 

}
}

}

|}

Finals 
Third place

}
}
|}

Championships

}
}
|}

Awards

Final standings

See also 
 2019 Premier Volleyball League Open Conference

References 

2019 in Philippine sport